The 2015–16 Scottish Challenge Cup, known as the Petrofac Training Cup due to sponsorship reasons, was the 25th season of the competition. It was competed for by 32 clubs, which include the 30 members of the 2015–16 Scottish Championship, 2015–16 Scottish League One and 2015–16 Scottish League Two, the top 2014–15 Highland Football League club with a valid SFA club licence (Brora Rangers) and the highest placed team from the 2014–15 Lowland Football League with a valid SFA club licence (Edinburgh City).

The defending champions were Livingston, who defeated Alloa Athletic in the 2015 final, but were eliminated in the quarter-finals by Rangers.

Rangers defeated Peterhead in the final at Hampden Park by a score of 4-0 to win the competition for the first time.

Schedule

Fixtures and results

First round

The first round draw took place on Monday 29 June 2015 at 14:30 BST at St Mirren Park.

North Section

South Section

Second round

The second round draw took place on Monday 27 July 2015 at 14:30 BST at St Mirren Park.

North Section

South Section

Quarter-finals

The quarter-final draw took place on Thursday 20 August 2015 at 14:30 BST at Hampden Park.

Semi-finals

The semi-final draw took place on Monday 12 October 2015 at 14:30 BST at Hampden Park.

Final

Source:

Statistics

Top goalscorers

References

External links
Petrofac Training Cup at the Scottish Professional Football League

Scottish Challenge Cup seasons
Challenge Cup
3